Themistocles Nicholas "Themi" Leftheris (born December 20, 1982) is an American-South Korean pair skater. With partner Naomi Nari Nam, he is the 2006 Skate America bronze medalist and 2007 U.S. national bronze medalist. With partner Ji Min-ji, he is a two-time (2016, 2017) South Korean national champion.

Personal life 
Leftheris was born on December 20, 1982, in Tarpon Springs, Florida. He studied communications at Long Beach City College.

Career

Early career 
Leftheris started skating at age 12 and began pair skating at 15. His first skating partner was Sarah Jo Damron-Brown.

With Jacqueline Jimenez, he became the 2001 U.S. novice silver medalist. They won a silver medal at the first event of the 2001–02 ISU Junior Grand Prix. They did not get a second event because the USFSA did not send skaters to any of the events following the September 11, 2001 attacks.

Leftheris competed with Nicole Hartunian in the 2003-04 season. With partner Julian Burns, he placed 13th at the 2005 U.S. Figure Skating Championships.

Partnership with Nam 

Leftheris had a tryout with Naomi Nari Nam in April 2005, two weeks after she decided to switch to pair skating. After winning both Regionals and Pacific Coast Sectionals, the pair placed 5th at the 2006 U.S. Championships.

In the 2006–07 season, Nam and Leftheris won the bronze medal at their Grand Prix assignment, 2006 Skate America. They won the bronze medal at the 2007 U.S. Championships behind Rena Inoue / John Baldwin and Brooke Castile / Benjamin Okolski. They ranked 6th at the 2007 Four Continents Championships.

On August 24, 2007, Nam underwent surgery to remove a bone spur and to repair torn cartilage in her right hip. She was on crutches for eight weeks and returned to the ice on October 19. As a result, Nam/Leftheris withdrew from their Grand Prix assignments, 2007 Skate America and 2007 Cup of China. They placed 7th at the 2008 U.S. Championships. Nam announced her retirement from competitive skating on October 10, 2008, citing her recurrent hip injury.

Nam/Leftheris were coached by Peter Oppegard and Karen Kwan-Oppegard at the EastWest Ice Palace in Artesia, California.

Later career 
Leftheris began competing with new partner Angelyn Nguyen in 2009. They won the bronze medal at the 2010 Pacific Coast Sectional Championships to qualify for the 2010 U.S. Championships. They withdrew from the U.S. Championships before the event began.

With Lindsay Davis, he finished 8th at the 2011 U.S. Championships.

In 2015, Leftheris teamed up with Ji Min-ji to compete for South Korea. The pair won the 2016 South Korean national title.

Programs

With Ji

With Nam

Competitive highlights 
GP: Grand Prix; CS: Challenger Series; JGP: Junior Grand Prix

With Ji Min-ji for South Korea

With Nguyen and Davis for the United States

With Nam for the United States

With Damron-Brown, Jimenez, Hartunian, and Burns for the United States

References

External links

 
 

American male pair skaters
American people of Greek descent
South Korean male pair skaters
Living people
1982 births
People from Tarpon Springs, Florida